Lucy Muthoni Kibaki (13 January 1936 – 26 April 2016) was the wife of former Kenyan President Mwai Kibaki and was First Lady of Kenya from 2002 to 2013.

Biography
Lucy Muthoni was born in 1936. Her parents were Rev. John Kagai, a pastor of the Presbyterian Church of East Africa and Rose Nyachomba, in Mukurwe-ini, Nyeri County, (formerly Nyeri District in Central Province), Kenya. She was educated at Alliance Girls High School, then trained as a teacher, working first at Kamwenja Teachers College and later at Kambui College in Kiambu, where she rose to the post of principal.

She met Emilio Mwai Kibaki in 1959. After a two-year romance, they married in 1961, with Lucy quitting her teaching career in 1963. They had four children: Judy Wanjiku, Jimmy Kibaki, David Kagai and Tony Githinji. She was a grandmother to Mwai Kibaki jnr Sean Andrew, Rachael Muthoni, and others. Kibaki was a patron of the Kenya Girl Guides Association.

Lucy Kibaki died on 26 April 2016 at Bupa Cromwell Hospital in London, after brief hospitalization at the Nairobi Hospital for chest pains. She was 80.

Charitable work
Lucy was known for supporting disadvantaged and disabled people. She chaired the Organization of the 40 African First Ladies Against HIV/AIDS.

References

1936 births
2016 deaths
First ladies of Kenya
Kenyan educators
Kenyan Roman Catholics
Alumni of Alliance Girls High School
Kenyan disability rights activists